Maroesjka Matthee (born 10 January 1989) is a South African road and track cyclist, who most recently rode for UCI Women's Continental Team . She represented her nation at the 2015 UCI Track Cycling World Championships.

Major results

2014
 2nd Omnium, South East Asian GP Track 3
 3rd Omnium, South East Asian GP Track 1
 3rd Points race, South East Asian GP Track 2
2015
 African Track Championships
1st  Individual pursuit
1st  Omnium
1st  Points race
1st  Scratch
1st  Team pursuit (with Ilze Bole, Claudia Gnudi and Danielle Norman)
 KZN Autumn Series
5th Freedom Day Classic
9th Hibiscus Cycle Classic
2016
 1st Keirin, SA Grand Prix
2018
 Africa Cup
1st Road race
3rd Team time trial
 2nd Road race, National Road Championships
2019
 African Games
1st  Road race
1st  Team time trial
2020
 3rd Road race, National Road Championships
2021
 1st  Team time trial, African Road Championships

References

External links

1989 births
South African female cyclists
Living people
Competitors at the 2019 African Games
African Games gold medalists for South Africa
African Games medalists in cycling
21st-century South African women